Shimshal (old name: Shingshal) is a village located in Gojal Tehsil of Hunza District, in the Gilgit–Baltistan region of Pakistan. It is the largest valley in Gilgit-Baltistan and it covers almost area of Hunza District. It is in the valley of the Shimshal River, a tributary of the Hunza River. Shimshal is a border village that connects the Gilgit-Baltistan area of Pakistan with China.

Settlements
Shimshal is made up of four major hamlets; Farmanabad, Aminabad, Center Shimshal, and Khizarabad. Farmanabad is a new settlement that comes first on reaching Shimshal. Aminabad is announced by vast fields of stones hemmed in by dry stone walls, and fortress-like houses of stone and mud. As you approach Shimshal look for a glimpse of Odver Sar, also known as Shimshal Whitehorn. Shimshal obtains hydroelectricity from the Odver stream from the warmer months of the year, June to October. Lack of electricity for seven months is a major problem for the local community because during this period they have had to rely on kerosene oil, firewood, solar plates, and compressed natural gas in cylinders as alternatives. A small hydro electricity power station of 0.200MW is under construction at Kuk area of Shimshal that is scheduled to be complete in 2017.

The village was inaccessible by motor roads until October 2003, when a new road from the Karakoram Highway at Passu was constructed. The construction of non-metallic Jeep-able road started in 1985 and completed in 2003. Eighteen years (1985-2003) of handwork finally became successful because of hard work, dedication and self-help. It became possible to connect Shimshal with rest of the world by mutual cooperation of the Aga Khan Rural Support Programme, Government of Pakistan and the local community. It now takes maximum three hours to reach Shimshal by jeep from Passu. Self-help or Nomus (in local Wakhi language) is the major factor for infrastructure development in Shimshal.

Shimshalis use numerous seasonal mountain grasslands, located several days walk from the village, to sustain herds of yaks, goats, and sheep. The area was founded by Mamo Singh and his wife named Khudija. They have the only son Sher. According to Shimshal's history and tradition, their first child won the local polo game from Kargiz (Chinese) riding yak while the Chinese rode horses. The Shimshal River comes from this area and then transforms the shape of Hunza River, which joins the Indus River below the capital city Gilgit.

The people of Shimshal are Wakhi and they speak the Wakhi language. They belong to the Ismaili sect of Shia Islam. The entire community is the follower of Aga Khan, 49th spiritual leader.

Shimshal has produced several well-known mountaineers for Pakistan; among those Samina Baig is the first women climber from Pakistan to scale Mt. Everest and all highest peaks in seven continents around the globe. Rajab Shah has the honor of scaling all five highest peaks in Pakistan. Both Rajab Shah and Mehrban Shah have received Presidential Award for Pride of Performance in the field of mountaineering. In fact Shimshalis are to Pakistan as Sherpas are to Nepal. Some people call Shimshal, The Valley of Mountaineers in Pakistan.

Shimshal is the largest village of Hunza valley. Its extensive pasture lands include; Shimshal Pamir, Gujerav, Yazghail and Loopghar. 

The Lok Versa Museum of Shimshal has some antiques, artifacts, musical instruments, and daily life items made from wood and showcases the creativity and rich history of local community.

Two books by Pam Henson are about Shimshal, "Shimshal" and "Women of Shimshal" have been published by the Shimshal Trust. Henson is a teacher from New Zealand and wrote these books based on her experiences teaching and living in Shimshal.

Shimshal River is formed from three sources: Khurdopin Glacier, Shimshal Pass and Zardgorban. The river also receives from other water sources before flowing into the Khunjrab River and then the Passu River before ending in Attabad Lake.

History 

The village of Shimshal was founded almostly 570 years ago (in 1450) by Mamu Singh, he was the brother of "Chu Singh", They both were Burushaski Speakers and they belong to the "Brong Family". Chu singh was the first Wazir of Hunza, he was the Wazir of First Mir of Hunza "Girkis" (Sahib Khan). Chu Singh was the foster father of Girkis. As Chu Singh and Mamu Singh were companion and supporter of "Girkis Tham". After  Hunza and Nagar was divided, Hunza come under the Rule of Girkis while Nagar come under the rule of his brother "Moghlot".

Mamu Singh was fond of Hunting and other Mountain Sports. One day in search of ibex, he went to Gojal. During his hunting trip, he fell in love with a beautiful girl named "Khadija"( about her it is said that either she was a Wakhi Speaker from Sirikol (now Tashkugan) or Moorkhun). They got married and then they start to live in the area of Boiber, one day while hunting he climb up to the summit of Karun Kuh. This provided him a chance to view the entire region and to see the gazing ground of Lup Goz. then they went the area Lup Goz with flock of sheep and goats. This area is Nowadays called "Astan". He got settled there and started to irrigate and cultivations of land to produce grain. His wife gradually became homesick and stopped talking to him.

One day he climbed on the high ground and ridge running east of "Astan". After traveling the high ground (area of Malanguti and rech) and came to a point from where he saw the vast area of "Shimshal Valley" (Shingshal). He noticed that there were signs of existence of a water channel. He assessed the situation and came to the conclusion that this flat barren land had remained under cultivation some time in the past. Thus, Mamu Singh decided to cultivate the abandoned land. He repaired the broken water channel and got water running through it for irrigation. After cultivations in the new settlement Mamu Singh decided to relocate from Astan to Shimshal along with his wife and herds. However, his wife was still not talking to him.

Soon after, Khodija gave birth to a son and they named him Sher, and then they started teaching him important things like hunting.

When he grew up he did go for hunting and one day while his way for a hunt he met some strangers in the Pamir. Strangers and Sher both said that the Pamir is theirs’. So they ended up saying that the winner of the polo match that they will be playing would rule the Pamir. The bet was if Sher drove the ball over Shimshal Pass toward Shuwert, he would win all the territories from Shimshal to Raskam. After winning the area Sher started to explore it and on the other hand his family thought that he was lost somewhere in Pamir forever.

After many years, he returned to Shimshal and he found out that his parents were dead. After a while he married a Wakhi woman and, and she bore him sons, and then the generations goes on and the three main lineage groupings of Shimshal: Gazikator, Bakhtikator, Walikutor and Baqikator were there.

Then after some time they started ruling with the Hunza rulers and Mirs then countries got independences, it is to be said that Shimshal was the part of China before but Pakistani government made some deals with China and gave Kashgir part of Pakistan to China and took Shimshal and some territory in Pakistan and draw a border line at shimshal pass.

But it was still under Mir and the Hunza kingdom until in 1974 when Zulfiqar Bhutto abolished Pakistan's last remaining princely kingdoms

Mir

Many narrators can remember life under the Mir's regime. The Mir is reported by some to have held his people back by limiting education and making it difficult for people to gain permission to travel outside Hunza. Shimshal, like other communities in Hunza, was required to provide the Mir with certain agricultural and livestock products as tax payments. In addition, because of Shimshalis' access to rock salt, Shimshal had a special salt tax. These taxes were carried by Shimshalis to Hunza. Baig Daulat provides a very detailed account of the taxes that Shimshalis paid to and carried for the Mir and how this was organised within Shimshal: "Those who possessed livestock and more family members and those on whom God had bestowed wealth were called lopan. They were required to pay yeelban (taxes)… Those who were poor were called borwar (literally, having load; those who carried the Mir's taxes)." However it is important to note that these positions were not fixed statuses. Someone with plenty of livestock and physically strong men in the family could choose to be borwar rather than lopan.

At the village level, certain individuals would act on behalf of the Mir in a range of positions including: arbob (the Mir's representative in the village); yarpa (responsible for the Mir's livestock); chorbu (public announcer). Several narrators suggest that the Mir accepted bribes from those in such positions or those who wanted such positions. Having a female relative who had breast-fed one of the Mir's family members could also ensure one obtaining a position: "My uncle Momin Shah was the first yarpa of Shimshal, because his mother's sister had [breast] fed Mir Nazeem Khan's son. So on the basis of this relation my uncle got the yarpagi for the first time".

Although the Mir's tax system came to an end in the 1960s, Shimshalis were still not entirely free from carrying loads for others. The Pakistan army came to Shimshal in the late 1960s and was posted in Pamir because of border disputes with China. Many Shimshalis worked as porters for the army. One narrator (Pakistan 20) explains: "we had to take their ration, ammunition from Passu to Quz (a pasture)... the government didn't pay our daily wages directly to our own hands. They had contractors… And these contractors were not honest enough to pay our wages. Sometimes they gave us a piece of cloth instead of the amount and most of the time they paid nothing." Today many Shimshalis work as porters for trekking and mountaineering groups and expeditions.

Shimshal Pass 

Shimshal Pass  rises above the village. It lies on the watershed between the Indus River and Tarim River basins, and leads to the valley of the Shimshal Braldu River, a tributary of the Shaksgam River on the border with China. Francis Younghusband was probably the first Englishman to reach the pass (1889). At the time it was used by raiders from Hunza to attack caravans traveling between Leh and Yarkand. There was a fort manned by Hunza soldiers, or raiders, or both. The pass is not part of Khunjerab National Park, but the Shimshal community has set an organization called SNT (Shimshal Nature Trust) which oversees the entire region and takes care of its own land. It is a community-based organization and is registered with the Government of Pakistan.

Annually, in the last week of July or the first week of August, there is a festival at Shimshal Pass, where locals partake in a yak race, followed by singing and dancing. In Wakhi language it is called Woolyo. This yak race is the only one of its kind, and is a unique event organised at high mountain settlements of Pakistan.

Shimshal Nature Trust
Shimshal Nature Trust is a community-based development organization. In January 2008, The Science and Practice of Ecology & Society Award (SPES) was granted to Shimshal Nature Trust by the Resilience Alliance.
The trust was created with the aim of providing community based nature conservation in response of National Park which was negated by community and remain one of the successful models of conservation efforts

Nomus (self-help village development programme)

Nomus is a Wakhi word commonly known in Shimshal valley. It is a unique social philanthropic (showing concern for humanity) system of the local community. Details are available here Nomus and Oral testimonies from Shimshal. It is one of its kind model of participatory community development in Gilgit-Baltistan area of Pakistan.

Tourism
 
Shimshal valley has its largest adventure area in Hunza and is a major attraction for tourists. Its mountains like Distaghil Sar, Kunjut Sar, Trivor, Pumari Chhish (W), Yukshin Gardan Sar, Momhil Sar, Malungutti Sar Shimshal Whitehorn Minglik Sar, Lupghar Sar, Dut Sar, Sonia Peak, Purian Sar, Yazghail Sar, Yawash Sar II and others are well known among mountains. Gigantic glaciers include Malangudhi, Yazghail, Khurdopin, Braldu, Odver, Ver Zharav, and main passes are Chafchingoal, Khurdopin, Mai Dur, Braldu, Boi Sam and others. Among which the Khurdopin glacier pass remains the most favorite destination for the trekkers. Shimshalis are to Pakistan as Sherpas are to Nepal. More than twenty well known mountaineers from this valley have made Pakistan proud in the field of tourism. Some people call it "The Valley of Mountaineers". Some of them are Rajab Shah, Mehrban Shah, Shambi Khan, Aziz Ullah, Qudrat Ali, Meherban Karim, Sarwar Ali, Shaheen Baig, Ali Musa, Amr Uddin Shah, Amin Ullah Baig, Sajjad Karim, Aziz Baig, Qurban Muhammad, Tafat Shah, Farhad Khan, Wahab Ali Shah, Fazl Ali, Hasil Shah, Yousaf Khan, Muhammad Ullah, Ezat Ullah, Muhammad Bari, Shafa Ali, Muhammad Abdul joshi, Saeed Ahmed, Jalal Uddin and others. Rajab Shah and Aminullah Baig has the distinction of scaling all five peaks more than eight thousand meters located in Pakistan.

Solar electricity 
There are almost 250 houses in Shimshal and almost every house uses solar panels to generate electricity. This means that compared to other people living in high altitudes in Pakistan, Shimshal residents spend their life in a better way. On 14 December 2016, Shimshal connected with rest of the world through cellular network of the Special Communications Organization known as SCOM. Special Communications Organization also known as SCO provides GSM services in Azad Jammu and Kashmir and Gilgit-Baltistan. The SCOM GSM service is connected with solar system in Shimshal. Samina Baig, who is Brand Ambassador of SCOM, played a vital role in providing cellular service to the people of Shimshal.

Naubahar School in Shimshal produces 20KVs of electricity using solar panels. This amount of electricity is enough to meet the electricity needs of 18 classrooms and an IT lab.

Notable people 
Samina Baig, hailing from Shimshal valley, is the first Pakistani woman to scale the world's highest mountain, Mt. Everest. She also has the honor of scaling all highest peaks in seven continents.
 Mirza Ali Baig hailing from Shimshal is also a mountaineer. In addition, he is a photographer and social worker. He is the brother of Samina Baig, and trained her climbing on mountains and mountaineering.
 Abdul Joshi, born in Shimshal, is the first Pakistani to summit Annapurna, the tenth highest peak in the world. He is also the eight Pakistani to summit Mount Everest.

References

External links
 KET Pakistan

 Pakistan Youth Outreach
 IUCN_MACP_Brochure_ Shimshal
 Voices from the Mountain_ Shimshal_ Panos London
 Shimshal Mountaineering School (SMS) is the best mountaineering school in Hunza valley. It is owned and managed by Shimshali mountaineers.
 Shimshal Health Care Center was recently constructed with the financial help of German donors.
 Navbahar Educational, Welfare and Development Organisation  (NEWDO) is the most active organisation working for the educational development in the valley by constructing educational facilities. Navbahar Secondary School, Shimshal is one of its kind educational institution in the village.
 Blankonthemap The Northern Kashmir WebSite
 2000 Mock & O'Neil Oprang Expedition Report
 Shimshal Trust
 Mountain Voices: oral testimonies from the Karakorum mountains, Pakistan
 Tim Craig, Life in a Pakistani village so remote, kings once banished prisoners to it, The Washington Post, 1 August 2015.

Populated places in Hunza District
Valleys of Gilgit-Baltistan
Regions of Pakistan
Ski areas and resorts in Pakistan
Regions of Gilgit-Baltistan
Tourism in Gilgit-Baltistan
Populated places in Gilgit-Baltistan
Hunza
Hunza District